The 1928 World Table Tennis Championships mixed doubles was the second edition of the mixed doubles championship.  

Zoltán Mechlovits and Mária Mednyánszky defeated Daniel Pecsi and Erika Metzger in the final by two sets to one.

Results

See also
List of World Table Tennis Championships medalists

References

-